The Finnish Customs is the customs service of the Republic of Finland. It is a government agency steered by the Ministry of Finance. The Finnish Customs is a part of the customs system of the European Union and has around 1,900 employees.

History

On February 12 1812, the founding of The General Customs Directorate of the Grand Duchy of Finland was approved by Alexander I of Russia as the Grand Duke of Finland. By the 1850s, customs duties' share of total state tax revenue was over 40 percent. The directorate was renamed the Board of Customs in 1881. The customs service of the Grand Duchy of Finland was autonomous from the customs service of the Russian Empire, and thus the transition to the customs service of an independent Finland in 1917 was smooth.

Customs duties formed the backbone of the Finnish state economy until the 1930s, but the fiscal importance of duties has decreased drastically due to the international reduction or elimination of trade barriers since the 1950s. Finland joined the EU and its Customs Union in 1995, but this caused no significant challenges for Finnish Customs.

Current activities
The tasks of Finnish Customs include the facilitation of the trade in goods, the protection of society and the environment, and the collection of customs duties, charges and taxes on import goods. It also compiles the official statistics on international trade.

Directors

Gustaf Hjärne 1812–1816
Claes Jakob Gripenberg 1816–1822
Jacob Snellman 1822–1828
Julius Conrad Antell 1828–1831
Christian Avellan 1831–1841
Berndt Federley 1841–1847
Carl Gustaf Enckell 1848–1849
Frans Olof af Brunér 1849–1855
Johan August von Born 1855–1865
Konstantin Wikman 1865–1881
Herman Peter Höckert 1881–1890
Birger Fridolf Winter 1890–1901
Bernhard Anton Harald Indrenius 1902–1903
Knut Gustaf Nikolai Borgenström 1903–1905
Eugraf Nyman 1905–1907
T. J. Boisman 1907–1910
Axel Fabian af Enehjelm 1910–1915
Pavel Strauch 1915–1917
Wilhelm Gabriel Poppius 1917–1935
Ilmari Killinen 1936–1942
Eljas Kahra 1942–1945
Auno Halonen 1945–1951
Nikolai Saarnio 1951–1968
Jorma Uitto 1968–1988
Jermu Laine 1988–1994
Berndt Olof Johansson 1994–1998
Tapani Erling 1998–2012
Antti Hartikainen 2012
Antti Hartikainen 2012–2013
Leo Nissinen 2013–2019
Hannu Mäkinen 2019–current

See also
 Finnish Border Guard

References

External links

 

Customs services
Government agencies of Finland